Red Dog is a beer produced by the Miller Brewing Company and is part of their Plank Road Brewery Family. The beer contains 4.8% alcohol by volume. It was introduced in 1994.

History
Red Dog was introduced in 1994 and is brewed with two barley malts and five varieties of American hops.  "Plank Road Brewery" was the name of Frederick Miller's first brewhouse in the 19th century. The Plank Road name was resurrected in the  1990s to sell Icehouse and Red Dog as a more premium beer under a different name, so as not to directly associate them with Miller Brewing. Using the tag line "Be Your Own  Dog," Tommy Lee Jones was hired to voice Red Dog TV commercials in the ad campaign from the  creative  team of Michael McLaughlin and Stephen Creet at BBDO, Toronto. Although popular during the mid-to-late 1990s, Red Dog faded  into near-obscurity after the turn of the 21st century. Since 2005, it has been returning to  stores in a current price segment between Miller High Life and Milwaukee's Best.

Advertising

Red Dog has done some commercials featuring the Red Dog mascot who is  voiced by Tommy Lee Jones.

References

American beer brands
Products introduced in 1994